Francisco Javier Galdeano (born 7 December 1949) is a Spanish racing cyclist. He rode in the 1971 Tour de France.

References

External links
 

1949 births
Living people
Spanish male cyclists
Place of birth missing (living people)
People from Estella Oriental
Cyclists from Navarre